Pandanus gemmifer, commonly known as pup pandan, is a plant in the family Pandanaceae that is endemic to northeast Queensland. It is closely related to Pandanus grayorum and Pandanus solms-laubachii.

Description
Like P. grayorum the stem is marked with spirally arranged nodules, which may eventually develop into "pups" or plantlets on the upper reaches of the branches. In this species the pups are numerous and densely packed, and the branches may be completely obscured by them. 

Ascending spurs occur along the leaf margins around the midsection of the leaf, and on the apex margins and midrib.

The inflorescences are terminal and pendant. The fruit is a syncarp, dark red when ripe and divided into 30 to 40 segments. Each segment contains up to 17 carpels, has a more or less domed upper surface, the apex of which is marked by the small crowed tips of the carpels.

Taxonomy
This species was first described in 1962 by the American botanist Harold St. John. His paper, titled "Revision of the genus Pandanus Stickman, Part 9, Three new Pandanus species from Queensland, Australia", was published in the journal Pacific Science. The type specimen was collected at "Fresh Water Creek, moist forest by stream, near intake, 500 ft. alt.", an area now known as Crystal Cascades.

Etymology
St. John stated in his paper that the species epithet gemmifer is from "the Latin, gemma, a bud; fero, to produce; in reference to the spectacular production of lateral, leafy buds."

Distribution and habitat
Pandanus gemmifer is restricted to northeast Queensland, occurring in disjunct populations near Coen on Cape York Peninsula, around Cairns and the Atherton Tablelands, and in the Paluma Range National Park.

Conservation
This species is listed by the Queensland Department of Environment and Science as least concern. , it has not been assessed by the IUCN.

Gallery

References

External links
 
 
 View a map of historical sightings of this species at the Australasian Virtual Herbarium
 View observations of this species on iNaturalist
 View images of this species on Flickriver

gemmifer
Endemic flora of Queensland
Taxa named by Harold St. John
Plants described in 1962